Karnan may refer to:
 Karna, a character from the Mahabharata also known as Karnan
 The Oath of Kärnan, a steel roller coaster in Germany
 M. Karnan, an Indian cinematographer and director
 Karnan (1964 film)
 Karnan (2021 film)